The UK Albums Chart is one of many music charts compiled by the Official Charts Company that calculates the best-selling albums of the week in the United Kingdom. Since 2004 the chart has been based on the sales of both physical albums and digital downloads. Since 2015, the album chart has been based on both sales and streaming. This list shows albums that peaked in the top ten of the UK Albums Chart during 2021, as well as albums which peaked in 2020 and 2022 but were in the top 10 in 2021. The entry date is when the album appeared in the top 10 for the first time (week ending, as published by the Official Charts Company, which is six days after the chart is announced).

Two-hundred and eighteen albums were in the top ten this year. Two albums from 2019 and twelve albums from 2020 remained in the top ten for several weeks at the beginning of the year, while Between Us by Little Mix was released in 2021, but did not reach its peak until 2022. Little Mix sixth studio album Confetti, was also the fastest-selling album of 2020 by a British act. Fine Line by Harry Styles debuted in 2019 and re-entered the top 10 in 2020, but its peak position was not until 2021. Christmas by Michael Bublé was originally released in 2011, launched a new chart run in 2020, reaching a peak on its latest run in 2021, when it returned to number-one. Olivia Rodrigo, Celeste and Arlo Parks were among the many artists who achieved their first top 10 album in 2021.

The first new number-one album of the year was Greenfields: The Gibb Brothers Songbook, Vol. 1 by Barry Gibb. Overall, forty different albums peaked at number-one in 2021, with Taylor Swift (2) having the most albums hit that position. An asterisk (*) in the "Weeks in Top 10" column shows that the album is currently in the top 10.

Background

Tom Jones becomes the oldest living male artist to achieve a UK number-one album
Welsh singer Tom Jones made UK chart history this year when, at 80 years and 10 months old, he became the oldest living male artist to achieve a number-one album in the UK Albums Chart with his 41st studio album Surrounded by Time. The album entered the chart at the top spot on 30 April 2021 (6 May 2021, week ending), giving Jones his fourth number-one album in the United Kingdom and his first in that country since 1999's Reload.

Olivia Rodrigo becomes youngest solo artist to score UK chart double
On 28 May 2021 (3 June 2021, week ending), American singer Olivia Rodrigo became the youngest solo artist to achieve the coveted UK chart double at 18 years and 3 months old. Her single "Good 4 U" climbed to number-one in the UK Singles Chart after debuting at number two the previous week, while her debut album Sour entered the UK Albums Chart at number-one. Rodrigo became the first artist since Sam Smith in 2015 to garner a UK chart double with a debut album.

Chart debuts
The following table (collapsed on desktop site) does not include acts who had previously charted as part of a group and secured their first top 10 solo album.

Best-selling albums
Adele had the best-selling album of the year with 30. = by Ed Sheeran came in second place. ABBA's Voyage, Sour by Olivia Rodrigo and Queen's Greatest Hits made up the top five. Albums by Dua Lipa, Ed Sheeran (÷), Elton John, Fleetwood Mac and Dave were also in the top ten best-selling albums of the year.

Top-ten albums
Key

Entries by artist
The following table shows artists who have achieved two or more top 10 entries in 2021, including albums that reached their peak in 2020. The figures only include main artists, with featured artists and appearances on compilation albums not counted individually for each artist. The total number of weeks an artist spent in the top ten in 2021 is also shown.

See also
List of UK Albums Chart number ones of the 2020s

References
General

Specific

External links
2021 album chart archive at the Official Charts Company (click on relevant week)

United Kingdom top 10 albums
Top 10 albums
2021